VIP Brother 1 was the first season of the celebrity version of the Bulgarian reality television show Big Brother. In it, the Housemates are only famous people. The show follows the original Big Brother rules, but with some changes. For example, in VIP Brother, the show's duration is shortened to a month. The nominations and evictions are twice a week.

The show started on 13 March 2006 and ended on 10 April 2006. The hosts were Niki Kanchev and Evelina Pavlova. The show was aired on Nova Television. The winner was the pop-folk singer Konstantin, who was voted by 78% of the audience. He won 50,000 leva.

Housemates
12 Housemates entered the House on Day 1.

Damaskin 
Damaskin Dukov "Dim" is a manager (currently TV host). He entered the house on Day 1 and finished fifth in the finale on Day 29. After his participation in VIP Brother 1, Damaskin became host of the show Big Brother's Big Mouth.

Dimitar 
Dimitar Marinov "Mityo Pishtova" ("The Gun") is a showman. He entered the house on Day 1 and finished fourth in the finale on Day 29.

Dicho 
Dicho Hristov is a musician and a pop singer. He entered the house on Day 1 and finished third in the finale on Day 29.

Galina 
Galina Kurdova "Galya" is a pop singer from the famous pop duet KariZma. Currently she lives in Sofia (previously in Yambol). She was born in Sibir. She entered the house on Day 1 and left voluntarily on Day 19.

Galya 
Galya Litova is a model. She entered the house on Day 1 and left voluntarily on Day 10. Her ex-fiancé Dicho was also a participant in the show.

Kiril 
Kiril Valchev "Skalata" ("The Rock") is a businessman. He entered the house on Day 1 and finished sixth in the finale on Day 29.

Konstantin 

Konstantin Slavchev is a pop-folk singer. He entered the house on Day 1 and became a winner on Day 29.

Lilana 
Lilana Deyanova is a pop singer. She entered the house on Day 1 and was the second evicted on Day 27, after receiving the fewest viewers' votes during the final week.

Lyubomir 

Lyubomir Milchev "Dandy" is a writer. He entered the house on Day 1 and left voluntarily on Day 19.

Rayna 

Rayna Terziyska is a pop-folk singer. She entered the house on Day 1 and was the first evicted on Day 15. During her 15 days on the show she was the subject of public scrutiny for her actions and behavior.

Vesela 
Vesela Neynski is an opera singer and an actress. She entered the house on Day 1 and left voluntarily on Day 8.

Violeta 
Violeta Zdravkova is a model and former Miss Bulgaria 1999. She entered the house on Day 1 with her 3-years daughter Danaya. There was a special room for the child. Danaya left the House on Day 12 to spend the weekend with her father and returned on Day 15. On Day 22, Violeta's mother took the child out of the House. She finished second in the finale on Day 29.

Weekly summary and highlights

Nominations table

Notes 

 : Vesela was automatically nominated by the Secret inquisition.
 : Votes against Vesela were invalid, as she was already nominated by the Secret inquisition.
 : Vesela asked to leave and the nominations were cancelled.
 : Violeta was nominated by the Secret inquisition, but won the Lucky game.
 : Dimitar was automatically nominated by the Secret inquisition.
 : Votes against Dimitar were invalid, as he was already nominated by the Secret inquisition.
 : Galina won the Lucky game; Lyubomir was banned from participating in it for discussing the nominations.
 : The eviction was cancelled as Lyubomir and Galya K. asked to leave.
 : The public was voting for a winner between Lilana, Kiril, Damaskin, Dimitar, Dicho, Violeta and Konstantin. The Housemate with the fewest votes was evicted on Day 27.

References

External links
The official website of VIP Brother 1

2006 Bulgarian television seasons
VIP 1
2006 Bulgarian television series endings